National Education Society's High School and Junior College is commonly known as NES High School, which is located in suburb of Mumbai, in Bhandup. It is the first institute of National Education Trust. The school was established on 14 April 1963, by the President of the school Dr. R Varadarajan. The school is affiliated to SSC and HSC board.

Academic programs 
Pre-primary
Primary
Secondary school
Junior College for Science, Arts and Commerce.

Teachers
All the staff member and teacher are co operative . All the teacher's are well trained .

The Times NIE
The school is the active member of The Times : NIE Students which is under The Times of India group, where the news about various schools is provided.

School Activities

Sports Meet
Every year the school has their sports meet, where various outdoor sports are conducted.

Quarterly sports meet
Quarterly sports meet is held thrice every academic year and covers a wide variety of indoor games.

Talent Parade
Talent parade is held once in a year for the students to showcase their talent in Dance, Drama etc.

Science Fair
Science Fair is conducted, where students showcase their projects related to Science topics.

Excluding this the school celebrates all the national activities and days with great vigor and enthusiasm. The values, culture and tradition are inculcated in the students right from the pre-primary to the junior college section.

Result tradition
The school as well as the college has tradition to bring 100% result in both SSC and HSC.

References

Sources
 http://mobiletoi.timesofindia.com/mobile.aspx?article=yes&pageid=13&sectid=edid=&edlabel=TOIM&mydateHid=08-09-2010&pubname=Times+of+India+-+Mumbai&edname=&articleid=Ar01305&publabel=TOI
 http://indiarightsonline.com/Sabrang/relipolcom12.nsf/5e7647d942f529c9e5256c3100376e2e/09a58a8bb16e8e72e5256cce003d8e11/$FILE/aab30358.pdf
 
 

High schools and secondary schools in Mumbai
1963 establishments in Maharashtra
Educational institutions established in 1963